Ab Barik-e Olya may refer to: 
 Ab Barik-e Olya, Kermanshah
 Ab Barik-e Olya, Aligudarz, Lorestan Province
 Ab Barik-e Olya, Selseleh, Lorestan Province
 Ab Barik-e Olya, Razavi Khorasan

See also
 Ab Barik-e Bala